Alejandra Bravo (born 1971) is a Canadian politician who was elected to represent Ward 9 Davenport on Toronto City Council following the 2022 municipal election.

Early life and education 
Bravo was born in Chile in 1971. She lived in Santiago until 1973, when a coup d’etat forced her family to Canada.

She earned a Bachelor of Arts in Latin American studies from the University of Toronto, before attending the Ontario Institute for Studies in Education.

Career 
Prior to her election to council, Bravo worked as manager of leadership and learning for the Maytree Foundation, and as director of leadership and training at the Broadbent Institute.

Political career

Early campaigns 
Bravo has run in the former Ward 17 Davenport in the 2003 Toronto municipal election, the 2006 Toronto municipal election and the 2014 Toronto municipal election, finishing in second place all three times behind Cesar Palacio. She did not run in the 2010 Toronto municipal election, instead endorsing Jonah Schein as a challenger to Palacio.

She ran as a New Democratic Party candidate in Davenport in the 2021 Canadian federal election, losing to Julie Dzerowicz by a 76-vote margin so narrow that it was verified in a judicial recount.

2022 Toronto election 
Ward 9 Councillor Ana Bailão announced that she would not be seeking re-election after serving on council for 12 years, leaving the seat in Davenport open for the 2022 election. Bravo joined the race on July 5, 2022, and ran on a platform which included ending exclusionary zoning, building affordable housing, providing stronger tenant protections, improving transit and building more cycling infrastructure. She received endorsements from the Toronto Star, the city's largest newspaper and Progress Toronto, a left-wing advocacy group.

Following the election on October 24, Bravo won the ward with over 70 percent of the vote. She took office on November 15, 2022.

Electoral history

References 

Toronto city councillors
Women municipal councillors in Canada
21st-century Canadian politicians
21st-century Canadian women politicians
Women in Ontario politics
New Democratic Party candidates for the Canadian House of Commons
Living people
Candidates in the 2021 Canadian federal election
Chilean emigrants to Canada
1971 births